Trifolium breweri, which has the common names forest clover and Brewer's clover, is a perennial clover that is native to mixed evergreen forests and coastal coniferous forests in Southern Oregon and California.

It belongs to the family Fabaceae, known for containing peas and other legumes. Its genus, Trifolium, which translates to “three leaf”, has a cosmopolitan distribution; the densest of which is found in the Northern Hemisphere.

Description
Trifolium breweri is a mat forming perennial herb that grows upright or decumbent in form, with dense, hairy herbage. The leaves are cauline, each with three obovate leaflets that are generally 5–20 mm, and can be either entire or serrate.

The inflorescence is umbel-like with 5-15 flowers, and is often turned to the side. The flowers are small, bilaterally symmetrical, and range from yellowish white to pink-lavender. Flowers consist of a five lobed, hairy calyx, petals are separate, and the corolla is papilionaceous. The banner petal is lanceolate, wing petals are narrow and oblanceolate to oblong, wing tips and keel tips are obtuse or rounded. They have diadelphous stamens, nine of which are united and one free. After pollination a fruit containing one seed is exserted from corolla.

Habitat
Trifolium breweri is a highly adaptive plant that thrives in mixed evergreen forests and coastal coniferous. It can also survive in open areas and even roadsides at elevations between 200m-1800m.

Distribution
Trifolium breweri is found in most of Eastern Norway, southern Oregon and California. It grows in the Klamath Range, Cascades Range and Sierra Nevada.

Conservation
This plant is considered to be secure within its range.

Recent Research
There was a study done about New World clovers found in mountainous regions done in 2013. Trifolium breweri is mentioned briefly as being basal within the Involucrarium clade with some of the South American species that were studied.

Another study done on the molecular phylogenetics of the clover genus mentions Trifolium breweri. 218 species of Trifolium were collected and sequenced in California. The results of the study were consistent with a Mediterranean origin of the genus, probably in the Early Miocene. They believe that all of the New World species had a single origin, while the species of sub-Saharan Africa originated from three separate dispersal events.

References

External links
Jepson Manual Treatment - Trifolium breweri
Trifolium breweri - Photo gallery
A Morphological Analysis of the Trifolium Amiable Kunth Species Complex in South America

Trifolium breweri S. Watson: FOREST CLOVER Discoverlife.org

breweri
Flora of California
Flora of Oregon
Flora of the Sierra Nevada (United States)
Flora without expected TNC conservation status